Austrophilus is a genus of hoverflies. There are 5 known species, all found in the Australia region.  Austrophilus is closely related to Habromyia.

Species
A. helophiloides (Walker, 1861)
A. laticornis (Bigot, 1884)
A. necopinus Thompson, 2000
A. obscurus Thompson, 2000
A. terraereginae (Ferguson, 1926)

References

Diptera of Australasia
Eristalinae
Hoverfly genera
Taxa named by F. Christian Thompson